"No Cheap Thrill" is a song by American singer-songwriter Suzanne Vega, which was released in 1996 as the second single from her fifth studio album, Nine Objects of Desire (1996). It was written by Vega and produced by Mitchell Froom. "No Cheap Thrill" reached number 40 in the UK Singles Chart in February 1997, giving Vega her fourth and final UK Top 40 hit.

Background
Vega has described "No Cheap Thrill" as "a song about romance using the language of gambling".

Music video
The song's music video was directed by David Cameron.

Critical reception
Upon its release as single, Larry Flick of Billboard considered it to be a "shining moment" from Nine Objects of Desire. He commented, "Vega's vocals are sewn into a short and direct rock beat that is frayed at the edges with gnarly guitars and ambient keyboards. All the while, the song's bright and peppy hook grab[s] the ear and never let[s] go." Pan-European magazine Music & Media described it as an "excellent mid-tempo track with plenty of radio appeal". They praised Froom for "diversifying Vega's folkie feel by introducing tempo changes, weird background stuff and providing a great base for her soft voice". A reviewer from Music Week rated it four out of five, adding, "A poppy lead single to Vega's forthcoming boundary-blurring album. This will delight early fans and intrigue those won over by the Tom's Diner remixes."

In a review of the Nine Objects of Desire, J. D. Considine of The Baltimore Sun noted that the song "flirts with calypso rhythms throughout its Runyonesque verse". Jeff Hall of the Courier-Post described it as "engaging barbed pop". Dan Kening of The Daily Herald commented, "The ultra-catchy 'No Cheap Thrill' compares a poker game to a seduction."

Track listing

 CD single
"No Cheap Thrill" – 3:09
"Luka" – 3:51
"Marlene on the Wall" – 3:39
"Tom's Diner" – 2:09

 CD single (European release #2)
"No Cheap Thrill" – 3:09
"Luka" – 3:51

 CD single (UK promo)
"No Cheap Thrill" (Radio Version) – 2:49

 CD single (US promo)
"No Cheap Thrill" (LP Version) – 3:09

 CD single (US promo #2)
"No Cheap Thrill" (U.S. Edit) – 3:00
"No Cheap Thrill" (U.K. Edit) – 2:49
"No Cheap Thrill" (LP Version) – 3:09

Personnel
No Cheap Thrill
 Suzanne Vega – vocals, guitar
 Pete Thomas, Jerry Marotta – drums, percussion
 Bruce Thomas, Sebastian Steinberg – bass
 Steve Donnelly, Tchad Blake – electric guitar
 Don Byron – clarinet, bass clarinet
 Dave Douglas – trumpets
 Jane Scarpantoni – cellos
 Cecilia Sparacio – flutes
 Mitchell Froom – keyboards

Production
 Mitchell Froom – producer of "No Cheap Thrill"
 Tchad Blake – recording and mixing on "No Cheap Thrill"
 Joe Warda – assistant recording engineer on "No Cheap Thrill"
 John Paterno, S. Husky Höskulds – assistant mixing engineers on "No Cheap Thrill"
 Bob Ludwig – mastering on "No Cheap Thrill"
 Lenny Kaye – producer of "Luka", "Marlene on the Wall" and "Tom's Diner"
 Steve Addabbo – producer and engineer on "Luka", "Marlene on the Wall" and "Tom's Diner"
 Rod O'Brien – engineer on "Luka" and "Tom's Diner"
 Shelly Yakus – mixing on "Luka" and "Tom's Diner"

Charts

References

1996 songs
1996 singles
Suzanne Vega songs
Song recordings produced by Mitchell Froom
A&M Records singles